Bronze pufferfish or bronze puffer may refer to two southeast Asian species of fish:

Auriglobus modestus
Chonerhinos naritus